José María Cabral Bermúdez (1902–1984) was a lawyer and businessman from the Dominican Republic. Cabral was member of the first junta that ruled the Dominican Republic after the fall of the dictatorship of Rafael Trujillo.

He was born into an upper class family, and was in his days the most important oligarch of the Dominican Republic.

Cabral Bermúdez was vice-president of the Reserve Bank of the Dominican Republic, and member of the administrative council of Ingenio Cristóbal Colón, a sugar company.

References

1902 births
1984 deaths
People from Santiago de los Caballeros
20th-century Dominican Republic businesspeople
Descendants of Buenaventura Báez
20th-century Dominican Republic lawyers
White Dominicans